94124 is a 1995 EP by the avant-garde band Zip Code Rapists.

Reception
The Allmusic review by Greg Prato awarded the album 3 stars stating:

Track listing

Personnel 

Scott Colburn – engineer
Danny Heifetz – clavinet, drums, percussion
Margaret Murray – artwork, photography
John Singer – bass, guitar, keyboards, optigan, backing vocals
Wally Sound – bass, lap steel guitar
Gregg Turkington – illustrations, loops, tape, vocals
Barney Virus – engineer

References

1995 EPs
Amarillo Records EPs
Zip Code Rapists albums